The 2019–20 season is Pallacanestro Varese's 75th in existence and the club's 11th consecutive season in the top flight of Italian basketball.

Overview 
The 2019-20 season was hit by the coronavirus pandemic that compelled the federation to suspend and later cancel the competition without assigning the title to anyone. Varese ended the championship in 10th position.

Kit 
Supplier: Macron / Sponsor: Openjobmetis

Players 
The team composition is the same as the last game played on January 26 before the interruption of the championship due to the coronavirus pandemic.

L. J. Peak left the team before the official early end of the season, he was transferred to Cluj-Napoca and replaced by Justin Carter that never played for the team.

Jason Clark left earlier as well, in order to join his family in US during the pandemic. Toney Douglas was called to replace him, but, like Carter, he didn't play any games either.

Current roster

Depth chart

Squad changes

In

|}

Out

|}

Confirmed 

|}

Coach

Competitions

Serie A

References 

2019–20 in Italian basketball by club